In molecular biology, the guanylate-binding proteins family is a family of GTPases that is induced by interferon (IFN)-gamma. GTPases induced by IFN-gamma (Interferon-inducible GTPase) are key to the protective immunity against microbial and viral pathogens. These GTPases are classified into three groups: the small 47-KD immunity-related GTPases (IRGs), the Mx proteins (MX1, MX2), and the large 65- to 67-kd GTPases. Guanylate-binding proteins (GBP) fall into the last class. 

GBP genes have been universally recognized in mammalian as well as in most other vertebrate genomes. A single cluster of seven human GBP genes (GBP1-GBP7) is found on chromosome 1q22.2. Unlike humans, in genetically controllable disease models such as mice and zebrafish, members of the GBPs gene family are organized in more than one cluster, in this case, 11 (Gbp2b- Gbp110 and 4 genes (Gbp1-Gbp4), respectively. Examinations of GBP-related sequences have shown that zebrafish gbp3 and gbp4 contain an additional function to find (FIIND) and a caspase recruitment (CARD) domains that resemble those found within the inflammasome-related proteins: Apoptosis-associated speck-like protein containing a CARD (PYCARD) and NLR Family Pyrin Domain Containing 1 (NLRP1).

Structurally,  GBPs consist of two domains: a globular N- terminal domain harboring the GTPase function, and an extended C- terminal helical domain. In addition, some members of the GBPs family harbor motifs (e.g., CaaX motifs) or additional domains that are thought to operate in protein-protein or protein-membrane interactions.

Some GBPs have exhibited the ability to bind not only guanosine triphosphate (GTP) to produce guanosine diphosphate (GDP) but also GDP to produce guanosine monophosphate (GMP) with equimolar affinity and high intrinsic rates of hydrolyzation. The physiological relevance of the GBP's GDPase activity might yield important insights to elucidate GBP-specific defensive profile versus other INF-induced GTPases(e.g.IRGs). Evidence has suggested GBPs as important players in a variety of disease conditions ranging from infectious and metabolic inflammatory diseases to cancer, 
In the context of cell protection against bacteria, early efforts conducting loss-function assays revealed a reduced host resistance to several pathogens when lacking GBPs. More recent studies have indicated that GBPs appear to be an agent that disturbs the structural integrity of bacteria, stimulates inflammasome signaling, forms complexes on pathogen-containing vesicles in infected cells, and fosters autophagy and oxidative mechanisms helping pathogen clearance.

Human GBP1 is secreted from cells without the need of a leader peptide, and has been shown to exhibit antiviral activity against Vesicular stomatitis virus and Encephalomyocarditis virus, as well as being able to regulate the inhibition of proliferation and invasion of endothelial cells in response to IFN-gamma.

References

Protein domains